The Angola national basketball team Under-16 represents Angola in international basketball matches and is controlled by the Federação Angolana de Basquetebol. At continental level, it competes at the FIBA Africa Under-16 Championship which is eligible for the FIBA Under-17 World Championship. Angola has been a member of FIBA since 1979.

International Competitions
In its capacity as the 2013 FIBA Africa Under-16 Championship winner, Angola has qualified for the 2014 Under-17 FIBA World Championship.

Roster

Head coach position
  Ricardo Cristiano Rodrigues

FIBA Under-17 World Championship record
 2010 FIBA Under-17 World Championship: N/Q
 2012 FIBA Under-17 World Championship: N/Q
 2014 FIBA Under-17 World Championship: 11th

African Championship record

Manager history
 Ricardo Rodrigues 2017
 Jacinto Olim Jabila 2015
 Manuel Silva Gi 2013, 2014
 Elvino Dias 2011
 Apolinário Paquete 2009

Players

A = African championship; = African championship winner;W = World cup

See also
 Angola women's national basketball team
 Angola national basketball team Under-18
 Angolan Basketball Federation

References

External links
 2011 Team at FIBA.com
 2013 Team at FIBA.com

Men's national under-17 basketball teams
under
Men's national under-16 basketball teams